Lakeland College may refer to:
Lakeland University (formerly Lakeland College), a university in Sheboygan County, Wisconsin
Lakeland College (Alberta), a community college system in Vermilion, Alberta and Lloydminster, Alberta and Saskatchewan, Canada
Lake Land College, a community college in Mattoon, Illinois
Lakeland Community College in Kirtland, Ohio